Rule of three or Rule of Thirds may refer to:

Science and technology
Rule of three (aeronautics), a rule of descent in aviation
Rule of three (C++ programming), a rule of thumb about class method definitions
Rule of three (computer programming), a rule of thumb about code refactoring
Rule of three (hematology), a rule of thumb to check if blood count results are correct
Rule of three (mathematics), a method in arithmetic
Rule of three (medicinal chemistry), a rule of thumb for lead-like compounds
Rule of three (statistics), for calculating a confidence limit when no events have been observed

Arts and entertainment 
 Rule of Three, a podcast by Jason Hazeley and Joel Morris
 Rule of Three, a series of one-act plays by Agatha Christie
 The Bellman's Rule of Three in The Hunting of the Snark, a poem by Lewis Carroll
 The Rule of Thirds, a 2008 album by Death In June

Other
 Rule of threes (survival), the priorities in order to survive
 Rule of Three (Wicca), a religious tenet 
 Rule of three (writing), a principle of writing, and of rhetoric
 Rule of thirds, a rule of thumb for composing visual images 
 Rule of thirds (diving), a rule of thumb for divers
 Rule of thirds (military), a rule of thumb in military planning

See also
 
 Three-sigma rule, for a normal distribution in statistics
 Triumvirate, a political regime dominated by three powerful individuals